This is a list of HV71 seasons through franchise history.

Note: GP = Games played; W = Wins; L = Losses; T/OT = Ties/Overtime; Pts = Points; GF = Goals for; GA = Goals against

1 NHL players in Elitserien due to the 2004–05 NHL lockout.

References

External links
 Historical Statistics from the Swedish Ice Hockey Association

HV71